Jaish al-Mujahideen, also spelled Jaysh al-Mujahideen (meaning Army of Mujahideen), may refer to:
Mujahideen Army (Iraq)
Army of Mujahideen (Syria)